Grigor Artsruni (also spelled as Krikor Ardzruni) (27 February 1845 – 19 December 1892) was an Armenian journalist, critic, writer and public activist, Doctor of Political Economy and Philosophy (degreed by Heidelberg University in 1869). In 1872, he began publishing the Mshak magazine, being its editor and manager until his death.

He studied at Moscow and Saint Petersburg universities, studied Armenian at Mekhitarists centers in Europe (Vienna and San Lazzaro, Venice). In 1872, he established and edited Mshak (Մշակ/Cultivator), the basis of Armenian liberalism. He had been its editor and manager until his death. Artsruni marked the necessity of development of capitalism in Armenia, supported the idea of armed resistance as a solution for the Armenian question. Artsruni was a mentor to the Armenian writer Raffi (1835–1888).

Works
 The economic situation of the Armenians in Turkey, (Original: Թիւրքաց հայերի տնտեսական դրութիւնը դասախօսութիւն)
 Էվէլինա Հոգեբանական Էտիւդ (Հայերէն Մի Անտիպ Ձեռագրից), publishing house Տէրտէրեան Ղուկաս Վրդ., Tiflis 1891
 The Eastern question, Tiflis, 1876 (in Russian).

Sources
Concise Armenian Encyclopedia, Ed. by acad. K. Khudaverdyan, Yerevan, 1990, Vol. 1, p. 383.
Armenia: The Survival of a Nation

1845 births
1892 deaths
Journalists from Moscow
Armenian journalists
Armenian male writers
19th-century Armenian writers
19th-century male writers
19th-century journalists
Male journalists
Heidelberg University alumni
Armenian people from the Russian Empire
Burials at Armenian Pantheon of Tbilisi
Expatriates from the Russian Empire in Italy
Expatriates from the Russian Empire in Germany
Expatriates from the Russian Empire in Austria-Hungary